Buchard is a French surname. Notable people with the surname include:

Amandine Buchard (born 1995), French judoka
Georges Buchard (1893–1987), French fencer
Gustave Buchard (1890–1977), French fencer

See also
Bouchard
Buchardt

French-language surnames